

Squad

Competitions

Serie A

Results

Notes
De Vezze was an unused sub.
Domenico Morfeo was an unused sub.

League table

Coppa Italia

Squad statistics

Appearances and goals

|-
|colspan="14"|Players who appeared for Parma that left during the season:
|}

Top scorers

Disciplinary record

References

Sources
  RSSSF - Italy 2007/08

Parma Calcio 1913 seasons
Parma